Lei Muk Shue Estate is a public housing estate in Sheung Kwai Chung, Tsuen Wan, New Territories, Hong Kong, near the exit of Shing Mun Tunnels. It is the largest public housing estate in the Tsuen Wan District, with the population of 28,100 in December 2021. Although it is geographically located in Sheung Kwai Chung (literally means "Upper Kwai Chung"), administratively it belongs to the Tsuen Wan District instead of the Kwai Tsing District because it is at the west of Wo Yi Hop Road, the boundary between the two districts.

History
Lei Muk Shue Estate was initially constructed in the 1970s when 17 buildings were erected. It started redevelopment in the 1990s, at which time eight old buildings were demolished. Ten new buildings and a shopping centre built between 1998 and 2005.

Houses

References

Tsuen Wan
Tsuen Wan District
Residential buildings completed in 1975
Residential buildings completed in 1980
Residential buildings completed in 1998
Residential buildings completed in 2000
Residential buildings completed in 2005
Public housing estates in Hong Kong